Raju Kher is an Indian actor and director. He directed the television serial Sanskaar in 1999.

Filmography 
Kher appeared in the following films and television serials:

Films
 Ghulam as Alisha's father
 Jungle as Mr. Malhotra
 Bub
 Om Jai Jagadish
 Bardaasht (2004) as Ramona's father (A. Saxena)
 Dreams(2005) as (Pooja's Father) 
 Delhi Belly as Zubin Mehra (Sonia's Father)
 Shootout at Wadala (2013) as Inspector Ambolkar
 Krrish 3 (2013) scientist at Kaal's Lab
 Ya Rab (2014)
 Main Tera Hero (2014)
 Black Home (2015)
 Love Exchange (2015)
 Dirty Boss (2016)
 Indian never again Nirbhaya as Rajnath (father of Nirbhaya)
 Shinaakht (2018)
 Darbar- Tamil
 Raakshasaru-Kannada Film (2022)
 [Unchai] as Anupam Kher's elder brother (2022)

Television
 Kuldeepak (2017) on &TV
Naati Pinky Ki Lambi Love story (2020) on Colors tv
 Yeh Kahaan Aa Gaye Hum on Zee TV
 Kahan Se Kahan Tak on Zee TV
 Karm on Zee TV as Pranlal Dhawan
 Sailaab on Zee TV
 Umeed on Zee TV
 Jeene Bhi Do Yaaro on SAB TV
 Tere Ghar Ke Saamne on SAB TV
 Jugni Chali Jalandhar  as Jugni's Father on SAB TV
 Abhi Toh Mai Jawan Hun on SAB TV
 Kashmakash on Doordarshan
 Imtihaan on Doordarshan
 Manzile on Doordarshan
 Abhilasha on DD Kashir
 Thoda Hai Thode Ki Zaroorat Hai on Sony Entertainment Television (India)
 Ek Raja Ek Rani (1996)-Kalidas
 Gopaljee (1996)-Colonel Jagannath Michoo
 Ghar Jamai (1996) -Varma  Special Appearance only in episode no 35 Zee Tv
  Rishtey (1999-2001)
 Fultoo Pagal Hai (2005)-Happy
 Hamari Betiyoon Ka Vivaah (2008)-Kulbhushan Singh
 Pari Hoon Main (2008) on Star One - 
 Taarak Mehta Ka Ooltah Chashmah (2010)-Mr. Chandiramani
 Parvarrish – Kuchh Khattee Kuchh Meethi - Mr. Ahluwalia Lucky's father Sweety's father-in-law on Sony Entertainment Television (India)
  C.I.D.  on Sony Entertainment Television (India)
 Beintehaa  on Colors
Yam Hain Hum on Sab TV
 Doli Armaano Ki on Zee TV as Darshan Tiwari (Tiwari ji)
  Tamanna on Star Plus
 Ek Maa Jo Laakhon Ke liye Bani - Amma (2016) on Zee TV - Faqeera
 Ret Ka Dariya (2002–05) on Sahara One
 Dil Dhoondta Hai (2017) on Zee TV
 Adaalat - Public Prosecutor on Sony Entertainment Television (India)
 Aashao Ka Savera... Dheere Dheere Se (2022-present) on Star Bharat

Television
(As a Director) 
 Sanskaar on Zee TV
Ret ka dariya on Sahara
Manzile on Doordarshan
Abhilasha on DD Kashir
Kuch khatti kuch mithi baatein with Anupam Uncle on Zee smile
Quiz show on renewable energy on Zee News

Nokia 3.2 Mobile Advertisement with Alia Bhatt 
T3

Personal life
His brother Anupam Kher is a famous actor. He married Reema Kher in 1986 and has two children with her.

References

External links

Living people
Kashmiri people
Male actors from Himachal Pradesh
People from Shimla
1957 births